Carlos Floriano Corrales (Cáceres, 12 February 1967) is a People's Party (PP) politician who represents Cáceres Province in the Spanish Congress of Deputies, where he serves as a PP spokesman and coordinator of the party's economics group. Floriano was first elected at the 2008 general election. Previously, he had served four terms in the Assembly of Extremadura. From 2000 to 2008, he was leader of the PP's Extremadura regional branch and served in the Senate of Spain during this period.

References

1967 births
Living people
Politicians from Extremadura
Members of the 4th Congress of Deputies (Spain)
Members of the 5th Congress of Deputies (Spain)
Members of the 6th Congress of Deputies (Spain)
Members of the 7th Congress of Deputies (Spain)
Members of the 9th Congress of Deputies (Spain)
Members of the 10th Congress of Deputies (Spain)
Members of the 11th Congress of Deputies (Spain)
Members of the 12th Congress of Deputies (Spain)
Members of the 7th Senate of Spain
Members of the 8th Senate of Spain
Members of the 13th Senate of Spain
Members of the 14th Senate of Spain
People from Cáceres, Spain
People's Party (Spain) politicians
Members of the 4th Assembly of Extremadura
Members of the 5th Assembly of Extremadura
Members of the 6th Assembly of Extremadura
Members of the 7th Assembly of Extremadura